Robinhood Markets, Inc. is an American financial services company headquartered in Menlo Park, California, that facilitates commission-free trades of stocks, exchange-traded funds and cryptocurrencies as well as individual retirement accounts via a mobile app introduced in March 2015. Robinhood is a FINRA-regulated broker-dealer, registered with the U.S. Securities and Exchange Commission, and is a member of the Securities Investor Protection Corporation. The company's revenue comes from three main sources: interest earned on customers' cash balances, selling order information to high-frequency traders (a practice for which the SEC opened an investigation into the company in September 2020) and margin lending. , Robinhood had 22.8 million funded accounts and 15.9 million monthly active users. In April 2022, Robinhood rolled out a cryptocurrency wallet to more than 2 million users.

History

Robinhood was founded in April 2013 by Vladimir Tenev and Baiju Bhatt, who had previously built high-frequency trading platforms for financial institutions in New York City. The company's name comes from its mission to "provide everyone with access to the financial markets, not just the wealthy". Tenev noted that executing a trade cost brokerages "fractions of a penny" but they typically charged fees of $5 to $10 per trade, as well as required account minimums of $500 to $5,000.

The firm showcased its app publicly for the first time at LA Hacks, first published it on AppStore in December 2014 and then officially launched the app in March 2015.

As of January 2015, 80% of the firm's customers belonged to the "Millennial" demographic and the average customer age was 26. Fifty percent of users who have made a trade use the app daily and 90% use the app weekly. As of 2022, Robinhood had 22.8 million funded accounts and 15.9 million monthly active users.

In April 2017, Robinhood raised $110 million at a $1.3 billion valuation led by Yuri Milner of DST Global, Greenoaks Capital, and Thrive Capital. 

On May 10, 2018, Robinhood closed a $363 million Series D financing round led by DST Global. , Robinhood raised a total of $539 million in venture capital funding, with the last valuation at $5.6 billion, up from their previous valuation of $1.3 billion.

In February 2018, the company announced that it would be moving its headquarters from Palo Alto to the former headquarters of Sunset magazine in Menlo Park.

In May 2019, reports from Bloomberg and other outlets publicized Robinhood's pursuit of an additional $200 million in funding, which could value the company in the $7 billion to $10 billion range. In November 2019, Robinhood announced its expansion to the United Kingdom.

During the 2020 stock market crash, Robinhood trading increased. The subsequent market rise was partially attributed to Robinhood traders, but a study indicated that Robinhood traders had little daily impact on major shares.

In May 2020, it was announced that Robinhood had raised $280 million in venture funding at a pre-money valuation of $8.3 billion led by Sequoia Capital, and 3 months later, the company announced a $200 million Series G funding round from a new investor, D1 Capital Partners, on August 17.

In late June 2021, Robinhood was fined $57 million by the FINRA and has been ordered to pay $13 million in restitution to clients affected by outages and misleading communications in March 2020. This was the largest-ever FINRA penalty in the history of the organization.

The company went public on the Nasdaq on July 29, 2021, under the stock ticker HOOD. The opening price was $38, but dropped shortly afterwards to a low of $33.35 before starting to recover, reaching an all time high at $85. Subsequently, it fell sharply again after facing growing regulatory uncertainty, plunging on Q3 earnings and disclosing that a security breach affected 7 million customers. On December 1, 2021, the stock price reached all time lows below $25 and had dropped 70% over the last four months. This rout was a boon to short-sellers of the stock.

Robinhood's further decline was highlighted in its 2022 layoffs, which gained widespread media attention. The first wave of major layoffs occurred in April, with the company cutting its workforce by 9%. More significant were Robinhood's layoff announcement released simultaneously with its 2022 Q2 earnings on August 2, in which Tenev announced the company would layoff 23% of its workforce, mostly in operations, marketing and program management. From January to August 2022, Robinhood's stock has shed 48% of its value.

In August 2022, Robinhood's cryptocurrency division was fined $30 million by the New York State Department of Financial Services for allegedly violating anti-money-laundering and cybersecurity regulations, in the department's first crypto enforcement action.

In May 2022, FTX founder and CEO Sam Bankman-Fried’s trading firm, Alameda Research, disclosed a 7.6% share in Robinhood. According to anonymous sources cited by Reuters in November 2022, Alameda used Robinhood shares as part of its collateral for a transfer of at least $4 billion from FTX.

Products and services

Stock and ETF trading

Robinhood's original product was commission-free trades of stocks and exchange-traded funds. In February 2016, Robinhood introduced instant deposits, crediting users instantly for deposits up to $1,000; previously, funds took three days to appear via ACH transfer. In September 2016 they launched Robinhood Gold, a premium subscription plan that offers up to $50,000 in instant deposits, margin trading, and more market analytics. As of February 2017, the company had executed over $30 billion in trades. In August 2017, the company began offering free stocks in exchange for referring new users. In December 2017, options trading was introduced. Services not offered include retirement accounts, mutual funds and bonds.

Robinhood typically only supports trading stocks and ETFs listed on the Nasdaq and New York Stock Exchange, and normally does not support over-the-counter securities such as those traded on OTC Markets. In August 2018, Robinhood introduced support for American depositary receipts, adding 250 highly searched international stocks. Robinhood has prohibited its users from purchasing some high-risk penny stocks, such as banning purchases of Helios and Matheson Analytics, the owner of MoviePass, in August 2018.

In October 2019, several major brokerages such as E-Trade, TD Ameritrade, and Charles Schwab announced in quick succession they were eliminating trading fees. Competition with Robinhood was cited as a reason. Charles R. Schwab, however, said that it was within his brokerage's intentions to eventually eliminate trading fees, as the firm had historically been a discount broker. Support for purchasing fractional shares and automatic dividend reinvestment was introduced in December 2019. Automatic recurring investments were introduced in May 2020. Access to initial public offering (IPO) shares was introduced in May 2021.

In March 2022, Robinhood announced it was adding four additional hours to extended trading for clients. In a push to eventually provide 24/7 equities trading, Robinhood said it will be available from 7:00 AM to 8:00 PM ET. In May 2022, Robinhood announced the launch of a stock lending program, allowing users to give Robinhood permission to lend out any fully paid stocks in their portfolio.

Cryptocurrency trading
On January 25, 2018, Robinhood announced a waitlist for commission-free cryptocurrency trading. By the end of the first day, the waitlist had grown to more than 1,250,000. Robinhood began offering trading of Bitcoin and Ethereum to users in California, Massachusetts, Missouri, and Montana in February 2018. In May 2018, Robinhood expanded its trading platform to Wisconsin and New Mexico. By 2021, cryptocurrency trading was available in every state except Hawaii and Nevada.

Robinhood later added trading for Bitcoin Cash, Dogecoin, Ethereum Classic and Litecoin. In September 2021, automatic recurring investments was introduced and Robinhood launched a waitlist for cryptocurrency wallets. CEO Vladamir Tenev stated that Robinhood may add more coins, saying, "We feel very very good about the coins that we’re currently listing on our platform and any new coins that we add we want to feel equally, if not more good." In April 2022, Robinhood announced that it had rolled out cryptocurrency wallets to every eligible person on its waitlist of over 2 million customers, and added trading for Shiba Inu, Solana, Compound, Chainlink and Polygon. Also in April 2022, the company announced integration of Bitcoin’s Lightning Network to enable faster transactions involving the cryptocurrency.

Banking

In June 2018, it was reported that Robinhood was in talks to obtain a U.S. banking license, with a spokesperson from the company claiming the company was in "constructive" talks with the U.S. OCC. In December 2018, Robinhood announced checking and savings accounts, with debit cards issued by Ohio-based Sutton Bank would be available in early 2019. Robinhood claimed the accounts would have a 3% annual interest rate; at the time of the announcement, the highest interest rate on a savings account from a licensed bank was 2.36%. Robinhood initially claimed the accounts would be SIPC insured, which the SIPC denied. The products were rebranded as "Cash Management" the next day. In January 2019, the waitlist and sign-up page were removed from the app. 

A Cash Management feature was announced in October 2019, with FDIC insurance from various partner banks and an annual 2.05% interest rate, though lowered before launch to 1.8% after a federal rate cut. The feature launched in December 2019. In March 2022, Robinhood launched the Robinhood Cash Card, a debit card that allows users to automatically invest in assets like stocks and crypto when spending money. With the launch of the Cash Card, the company retired its Cash Management debit card.

Retirement products

Robinhood offers both traditional individual retirement accounts (IRAs) and Roth IRAs. Robinhood is matching 1% of eligible contributions that customers put into their IRA.

Controversies

Payment for order flow 

Bloomberg News reported in October 2018 that Robinhood had received almost half of its revenue from payment for order flow. The company later confirmed this on its corporate website when asked by CNBC. The Wall Street Journal found that Robinhood "appears to be taking more cash for orders than rivals," by up to a 60-to-1 ratio, according to its regulatory filings.

The Financial Industry Regulatory Authority fined Robinhood $1.25 million in December 2019 for failing to ensure that its customers received the best price for orders. All of Robinhood's trades between October 2016 and November 2017 were routed to companies that paid for order flow, and the company did not consider the price improvement which may have been obtained through other market makers. Robinhood was sued in a class-action law suit in December 2020 for failing to disclose that a large portion of its revenue relied on payment for order flow.

Security breaches
In July 2019, Robinhood admitted to storing customer passwords in cleartext and in readable form across their internal systems, according to emails it sent to the affected customers. Robinhood declined to say how many customers were affected by the error and claims that it did not find any evidence of abuse. However, in 2020, the firm acknowledged that almost 2,000 Robinhood Markets accounts were compromised in the hack and that the hackers had siphoned off customer funds — a sign that the attacks were more widespread than was previously known, and not forthcoming originally by Robinhood.

In early November 2021 the company announced that about 5 million customers had their email addresses stolen by hackers via a voice phishing scheme. Another 2 million customers's full names were also taken. Three hundred customers had more extensive personal information taken. It is believed that the hacker and breachfourms owner "pompompurin"  who was behind the 2021 FBI email hack and was arrested by in March 2023 was responsible for the breach.

Infinite leverage
In November 2019, a user on the WallStreetBets subreddit shared a glitch that allowed Robinhood Gold users to borrow unlimited funds via selling covered calls where the shares had been bought using leverage, and the premium from the call was used to access additional leverage to buy more shares in order to sell more calls and so on. The loophole was closed shortly thereafter and the accounts that exploited it were suspended, but not before some accounts recorded six figure losses by using what WallStreetBets users dubbed the "infinite money cheat code."

Outages 

On Monday, March 2, 2020, Robinhood suffered a systemwide, all-day outage during the largest daily point gain in the Dow Jones' history, preventing users from performing most actions on the platform, including opening and closing positions. During this outage the S&P 500 climbed more than 4.6 percent. Robinhood users postulated that the outage was the result of a coding error regarding leap year handling for Saturday, February 29, 2020. Robinhood denied these claims. Robinhood said that they will offer compensation on a case-by-case basis. Robinhood experienced another major systemwide outage on March 9. Robinhood is currently facing three lawsuits due to outages in March 2020.

Suicide of Alexander E. Kearns

It was later discovered that this was a temporary negative balance due to unsettled trading activity. In his suicide note, Kearns, who was 20 years old at the time of his death, accused Robinhood of allowing him to pile on too much risk. In a press release, Robinhood promised considering additional criteria and education for customers seeking level 3 options authorization. Kearns' family filed and later settled a wrongful death lawsuit with the company.

2020 SEC probe 

On September 2, 2020, the Wall Street Journal reported that Robinhood was under SEC investigation for failing to fully disclose selling clients' orders to high-speed trading firms, with a potential $10 million-plus fine. Robinhood paid $65 million to settle the SEC investigation on December 17, 2020.

Gamification in Massachusetts 

On December 16, 2020, the Securities Division of the Massachusetts Secretary of the Commonwealth filed an administrative complaint alleging violation of state securities laws by "marketing itself to Massachusetts investors without regard for the best interests of its customers and failing to maintain the infrastructures and procedures necessary to meet the demands of its rapidly growing customer base." As a result of their gamified interface allowing new investors to participate in short selling and advanced derivatives trading (i.e. options), the Massachusetts Securities Division contended that Robinhood exploits novice investors, since these types of trades are usually considered "out of bounds" for new investors due to the high risk involved in them. In March 2022, Suffolk County Superior Court declared that the new fiduciary duty rule underlying parts of the case was invalid. The decision did not negate all enforcement action from state regulators, which could still pursue some claims against the company.

2021 short squeeze

On January 28, 2021, Robinhood and other retail brokers, including Webull, restricted the trading of certain stocks following an effort by users of r/wallstreetbets subreddit to drive up their price. Robinhood restricted trading in these stocks in order to meet collateral requirements at their clearinghouse, the National Securities Clearing Corporation. This decision attracted condemnation from internet users on the subreddit and on Twitter, as well as politicians. The House Committee on Financial Services questioned Robinhood CEO Vlad Tenev during a hearing on February 18, 2021.

Following the controversy, the app suffered an influx of one-star reviews on the Google Play app store. Google deleted at least 100,000 such reviews, calling them "coordinated or inorganic". However, after another round of negative reviews on the app dropping it to a 1.1-star rating, Google confirmed that the new reviews do not violate Google policies and will not be removed. Protesters also showed up outside Robinhood headquarters in Menlo Park, California, at the Securities and Exchange Commission headquarters in Washington, D.C., and the New York Stock Exchange. On January 28, a class-action lawsuit against Robinhood for alleged market manipulation was filed in the Southern District of New York. The lawsuit alleges that the app “purposefully, willfully, and knowingly removing the stock ‘GME’ from its trading platform in the midst of an unprecedented stock rise [...] deprived retail investors of the ability to invest in the open-market and manipulating the open-market.” Later that day, the company announced that it would reallow limited buys of the stocks on January 29.

References

External links

 
2013 establishments in California
American companies established in 2013
2021 initial public offerings
Companies based in Menlo Park, California
Financial services companies based in California
Financial services companies established in 2013
Online brokerages
Online financial services companies of the United States
Companies listed on the Nasdaq